Jeferson Anti Filho (born March 27, 1992 in Piracicaba), known as Jeferson Paulista, is a Brazilian footballer who plays as midfielder.

Career statistics

References

External links

Jeferson Paulista at ZeroZero

1992 births
Living people
Brazilian footballers
Association football midfielders
Botafogo de Futebol e Regatas players
Oeste Futebol Clube players
Rio Claro Futebol Clube players
ABC Futebol Clube players
Rio Branco Esporte Clube players
Associação Desportiva Itaboraí players
Sociedade Esportiva do Gama players
Rio Preto Esporte Clube players
Grêmio Esportivo Juventus players
Nova Iguaçu Futebol Clube players
Campeonato Brasileiro Série A players
Campeonato Brasileiro Série B players
People from Piracicaba
Footballers from São Paulo (state)